Bookclub is a monthly programme, devised by Olivia Seligman and hosted by Jim Naughtie and broadcast on BBC Radio 4.  Each month a novel is selected, and its author invited to discuss it. The title of the chosen work for the next recording is announced at the end of each broadcast; this allows listeners to read the book in advance, and those who attend recording to prepare questions which they can then put to the author.

See also
 Books in the United Kingdom

External links

Bookclub at RadioListings.co.uk

BBC Radio 4 programmes
Literary radio programs
Book podcasts